The 12119 / 20 Amravati - Ajni Intercity Express is an Express train belonging to Indian Railways Central Railway zone that runs between  and  in India.

Coaches
The 12119 / 20 Amravati Ajni Intercity Express has nine general unreserved & two SLR (seating with luggage rake) coaches . It does not carry a pantry car coach.

As is customary with most train services in India, coach composition may be amended at the discretion of Indian Railways depending on demand.

Service

Routing

Traction
As the route is electrified, a Kalyan Loco Shed based WCAM 3 electric locomotive pulls the train to its destination.

References

External links
12119 Intercity Express at India Rail Info
12120 Intercity Express at India Rail Info

Intercity Express (Indian Railways) trains
Transport in Nagpur
Rail transport in Maharashtra
Transport in Amravati